NYcon is the name given to three Worldcons held in New York City.

 NYcon I, 1939
 NYcon II (a.k.a. NeYorCon), 1956
 NYcon 3, 1967